The following highways are numbered 469:

Canada
Manitoba Provincial Road 469

Japan
 Japan National Route 469

United States 
  Interstate 469
  Florida State Road 469 (pre-1945) (former)
  Louisiana Highway 469
  Mississippi Highway 469
  Puerto Rico Highway 469